Mila M. Jasey (born May 29, 1951) is an American Democratic Party politician who has represented the 27th Legislative District in the New Jersey General Assembly since taking office on November 8, 2007.

Early life and education
Jasey was born in Madison, Wisconsin on May 29, 1951, and raised in Minnesota and California, where she attended the local public schools. She graduated with a B.A. from Barnard College in History, and was awarded an M.S. from the Lienhard School of Nursing at Pace University.

Jasey was a trustee of the South Orange-Maplewood School District Board of Education from 1999 to 2007.

She lives in South Orange with her husband Neil; they have three grown children together.

New Jersey General Assembly
Jasey was sworn into the Assembly , filling the seat that had been vacated by Mims Hackett on September 10, 2007.

Jasey was one of the lead authors of New Jersey's Interdistrict Public School Choice Program in 2010. Jasey was one of the authors of the New Jersey law that allows private schools in urban areas to convert to charters.

Committees 
Committee assignments for the current session are:
Higher Education, as Chair
Education, as Vice-Chair
Aging and Senior Services
Joint Committee on the Public Schools

District 27 
Each of the 40 districts in the New Jersey Legislature has one representative in the New Jersey Senate and two members in the New Jersey General Assembly. The representatives from the 27th District for the 2022—23 Legislative Session are:
Senator Richard Codey (D) 
Assemblyman John F. McKeon (D) 
Assemblywoman Mila Jasey (D)

References

External links
Assemblywoman Mila Jasey's legislative web page, New Jersey Legislature
New Jersey Legislature financial disclosure forms
2011 2010 2009 2008 2007 2006

1951 births
Living people
American nurses
American women nurses
Barnard College alumni
Democratic Party members of the New Jersey General Assembly
Pace University alumni
People from Madison, Wisconsin
People from South Orange, New Jersey
Politicians from Essex County, New Jersey
Women state legislators in New Jersey
21st-century American politicians
21st-century American women politicians